On Ice is the third and final studio album by Australian alternative rock band Machine Gun Fellatio. The album was released on 18 October 2004 on Festival Records. The album debuted at No.36 on the Australian Album Chart in October 2004.

The album was later re-released which included a bonus DVD, featuring four live video tracks and two videos.

Track listing

Charts

References 

2004 albums
Machine Gun Fellatio albums